The Arenimicrobiaceae is a family of bacteria.

References

Bacteria families
Acidobacteriota